Daniel Toribio Gutiérrez (born 5 October 1988) is a Spanish professional footballer who plays as a midfielder for Andorran club FC Santa Coloma.

Club career
Born in Girona, Catalonia, Toribio was a product of FC Barcelona's youth academy. He joined Atlético Malagueño in 2009, from where he was promoted to Málaga CF's first team midway through the season, his La Liga debut coming on 7 November 2009 in a 2–2 away draw against CD Tenerife; another player from the reserves, Javi López, also made his first appearance in that game.

On 17 August 2010, Toribio and Javi López joined SD Ponferradina of the Segunda División on loan for the campaign. On 6 July 2011, he terminated his two-year contract with Málaga and signed for another team in that level, Villarreal CF B.

Toribio continued to compete in the second tier the following years, representing Real Murcia, Deportivo Alavés, AD Alcorcón and Racing de Santander. On 22 September 2020, he signed for Extremadura UD one division below.

Career statistics

Club

References

External links

1988 births
Living people
Sportspeople from Girona
Spanish footballers
Footballers from Catalonia
Association football midfielders
La Liga players
Segunda División players
Segunda División B players
Primera Federación players
Segunda Federación players
FC Barcelona Atlètic players
Terrassa FC footballers
Atlético Malagueño players
Málaga CF players
SD Ponferradina players
Villarreal CF B players
Villarreal CF players
Real Murcia players
Deportivo Alavés players
AD Alcorcón footballers
Racing de Santander players
Extremadura UD footballers
Primera Divisió players
FC Santa Coloma players
Spanish expatriate footballers
Expatriate footballers in Andorra
Spanish expatriate sportspeople in Andorra